Spiridon Mattar (March 1, 1921 – July 26, 2014) was an Egyptian-born Brazilian Melkite Greek Catholic hierarch of the Melkite Greek Catholic Eparchy of Nossa Senhora do Paraíso em São Paulo.

Biography
Mattar was born in Alexandria, Egypt from Lebanese parents, but grew up in Beirut and was ordained here as a priest on July 20, 1946. He studied theology and philosophy at the Seminary Saint Anne in Jerusalem. He was secretary in the Melkite bishopric in Beirut, Lebanon; Pastor of Our Lady of Providence; Superior of the Saint Basil School; Vicar General in Beirut; President of the Ecclesiastical Court – Patriarchal; Parish priest of Saint John Chrysostom (Chaplain). Mattar was appointed bishop of the Eparchy of Nossa Senhora do Paraíso em São Paulo on June 22, 1978 and ordained bishop on July 20, 1978. Mattar resigned from the diocese on April 20, 1990. At the time of his death in 2014 he operated in the Sanctuary of Bom Jesus, in Boa Esperança, Minas Gerais.

References

External links
Catholic-Hierarchy

20th-century Eastern Catholic bishops
21st-century Eastern Catholic bishops
Eastern Catholic bishops in Brazil
Lebanese Melkite Greek Catholics
Melkite Greek Catholic bishops
1921 births
2014 deaths
Brazilian Melkite Greek Catholics
People from Alexandria
Lebanese emigrants to Brazil